This is a list of airlines currently operating in Kenya:

{|  class="wikitable sortable" style="border: 0; cellpadding: 2; cellspacing: 3;"
|- valign="middle"
! Airline
! Image
! IATA
! ICAO
! Callsign
! Hub airport(s)
! class="unsortable"|Notes
|-
| 748 Air Services|| || H4 || IHO || SEFEAS || Nairobi-Kenyatta Airport ||
|-
| Aberdair Aviation|| ||  || BDV || ABERDAV || Nairobi-Wilson Airport ||
|-
| Aero-Pioneer Group || || || ||  || Nairobi-Wilson Airport ||
|-
| Acariza Aviation || ||  ||  ||  || Nairobi-Wilson Airport ||
|-
| AD Aviation Aircharters || ||  ||  ||  || Nairobi-Wilson Airport ||
|-
| Aeronav Air Services || ||  ||  ||  || Nairobi-Wilson Airport ||
|-
| AeroSpace Consortium || ||  || AKQ || MOONFLIGHT || Nairobi-Kenyatta Airport ||
|-
| African Express Airways || || XU || AXK || EXPRESS JET|| Nairobi-Kenyatta Airport ||
|-
| Air Direct-Connect || || DQ || DCP || || Nairobi-Kenyatta Airport ||
|-
| Airkenya Express ||  || P2 || XAK || SUNEXPRESS  || Nairobi-Wilson Airport ||
|-
| Airlink Kenya || || ||  ||  || Nairobi-Wilson Airport ||
|-
| AirTraffic Africa || || || ATY || AIRCARE || Nairobi-Wilson Airport ||
|-
| Airworks Kenya Limited
|
| 
| AKS
| AKEL
| Nairobi-Wilson Airport
| Scheduled and non scheduled Operations
|-
| ALS - Aircraft Leasing Services ||  || K4 || ALW ||  || Nairobi-Wilson Airport ||
|-
| Astral Aviation ||  || 8V || ACP || ASTRAL CARGO || Nairobi-Kenyatta Airport ||
|-
| Aushaan Air || || || HAN || KING BEE || Nairobi-Wilson Airport || 
|-
| Avro Express || ||  ||  ||  || Nairobi-Wilson Airport ||
|-
| Blue Bird Aviation ||  ||  || BBZ || COBRA || Nairobi-Wilson Airport ||
|-
| Blue Sky Aviation Services || ||  || SBK || MAWINGU || Mombasa-Moi Intl. Airport ||
|-
| Buffair Services || || || BUF || SPEEDHAWK || Nairobi-Wilson Airport || 
|-
| Capital Airlines || ||  || CPD || CAPITAL DELTA || Nairobi-Wilson Airport ||
|-
| DAC Aviation || || JX ||  ||  || Nairobi-Wilson Airport ||
|-
| Fanjet Express || || || FJE  || FANJET || Nairobi-Wilson Airport || 
|-
| Fly540 ||  || 5H || FFV || SWIFT TANGO || Nairobi-Kenyatta Airport ||
|-
| Eastafrican.com || || B5 || EXZ || TWIGA || Nairobi-Kenyatta Airport ||
|-
| Everett Aviation || || || EVK || EVERETT || Mombasa-Moi Intl. Airport || 
|-
| Freedom Airline Express || || 4F || FDT || FREEDOM EAGLE || Nairobi-Wilson Airport ||
|-
| Global Airlift || || || GAW || SKYCRAWLER || Nairobi-Wilson Airport ||
|-
| Great Airways || ||  ||  || || Nairobi-Kenyatta Airport ||
|-
| Jambojet ||  || JM || JMA || CHUI || Nairobi-Kenyatta Airport ||
|-
| Jetways Airlines || || WU || JWX || JETWAYS || Nairobi-Wilson Airport ||
|-
| Jubba Airways (Kenya) || || 3J || JBW || AIRJUB || Nairobi-Kenyatta Airport ||
|-
| KASAS || || || || || Nairobi-Wilson Airport ||
|-
| Kenya Airways ||  || KQ || KQA || KENYA || Nairobi-Kenyatta Airport ||
|-
| Knight Aviation  || || || || || Nairobi-Wilson Airport ||
|-
| LadyLori || || || || || Nairobi-Wilson Airport ||
|-
| Mombasa Air Safari ||  || || RRV || SKYROVER || Mombasa-Moi Intl. Airport||
|-
| Pan African Airways || || 5F || ODM || JETAFRICA || Nairobi-Kenyatta Airport ||
|-
| Penial Air || ||  || PEL || AIRPEN || n/a || 
|-
| Phoenix Aviation || || || PHN || JADESTAR || Nairobi-Wilson Airport ||
|-
| Queensway Air Services  || || || || || Nairobi-Wilson Airport ||
|-
|  Reliance Air Charters  ||  || || || || Nairobi-Wilson Airport ||
|-
| Renegade Air || || || RNG || RENEGADE || Wajir Airport || 
|-
| Ribway Cargo Airlines  || || || || || Nairobi-Kenyatta Airport ||
|-
| Safari Express Cargo || || ZF || SXY || SAFARI EXPRESS || Nairobi-Kenyatta Airport ||
|-
| Safarilink Aviation || || F2 || XLK || SAFARILINK || Nairobi-Wilson Airport ||
|-
| Safe Air || || K3 || SAQ || SINBAD || Nairobi-Wilson Airport ||
|-
| Silverstone Air Services || || K5 || SLR || SILVERSTONE || 2013 || 
|-
| Skytrail Air Safaris || || || || || Bamburi Airport ||
|-
| Skyward Express || || OW || SEW || SKYWARD EXPRESS || Nairobi-Wilson Airport ||
|-
| Solenta Aviation Kenya || || || || || Nairobi-Kenyatta Airport ||
|-
| Tamarind Air || || || || || Nairobi-Kenyatta Airport ||
|-
| Timbis Air || || 2T || TBS || TIMBIS || Nairobi-Kenyatta Airport ||
|-
| Transafrican Air || || TA || TAK || TRANSAFRICAN || Nairobi-Kenyatta Airport || 
|-
| Transworld Safaris || || || || || Nairobi-Wilson Airport ||
|-
| Trident Aviation || || || || || Nairobi-Wilson Airport ||
|-
| Tubania Aviation Group || || || || || Nairobi-Wilson Airport ||
|-
| Yellow Wings Air Service || || || ELW  || YELLOW WINGS || Nairobi-Wilson Airport || 
|-
| Z.Boskovic Air Charters || || || ZBA  || BOSKY || Nairobi-Wilson Airport || 
|-
|}

See also

 List of defunct airlines of Kenya
 List of airports in Kenya
 List of airlines

References

External links

Kenya
Airlines
Airlines
Kenya